The Nut is a volcanic plug near the town of Stanley, Tasmania. It is made of fragments of basaltic volcanic rock from a volcano that was active about 25–70 million years ago.

History
The areas around it are culturally significant to the local Tarkine Aboriginal people because of stone formations, middens, quarries and artefact scatters near the area.

The European discovery of the Nut was made by George Bass and Matthew Flinders when they circumnavigated Tasmania in the sloop Norfolk. The origins of its name are speculated to be from the Tasmanian Aboriginal name, "munatrik" (moo-nut-re-ker), or because explosives were unable to dent it during the construction of a breakwater.

References

Mountains of Tasmania